Te Horo and Te Horo Beach are two localities on the Kapiti Coast of New Zealand's North Island. Te Horo Beach is the larger of the two settlements and, as its name implies, is located on the Tasman Sea coast. Te Horo is located to the east, a short distance inland. They are situated between Peka Peka and Waikanae to the south and Ōtaki to the north. "Te Horo" in the Māori language means "the landslide".

Marae

The local Katihiku Marae and Tamatehura meeting house is a traditional meeting place of the Ngāti Raukawa ki te Tonga hapū of Ngāti Huia.

Demographics

Te Horo Beach

The population of Te Horo Beach was 339 in the 2018 New Zealand census, an increase of 57 (20.2%) since the 2013 census, and an increase of 111 (48.7%) since the 2006 census. There were 177 males and 162 females, giving a sex ratio of 1.09 males per female. Ethnicities were 324 people  (95.6%) European/Pākehā, 39 (11.5%) Māori, 6 (1.8%) Pacific peoples, and 3 (0.9%) Asian (totals add to more than 100% since people could identify with multiple ethnicities). Of the total population, 45 people  (13.3%) were under 15 years old, 39 (11.5%) were 15–29, 195 (57.5%) were 30–64, and 60 (17.7%) were over 65.

Te Horo statistical area

Te Horo had a population of 1,422 at the 2018 New Zealand census, an increase of 135 people (10.5%) since the 2013 census, and an increase of 306 people (27.4%) since the 2006 census. There were 585 households. There were 717 males and 705 females, giving a sex ratio of 1.02 males per female. The median age was 50.1 years (compared with 37.4 years nationally), with 219 people (15.4%) aged under 15 years, 159 (11.2%) aged 15 to 29, 765 (53.8%) aged 30 to 64, and 282 (19.8%) aged 65 or older.

Ethnicities were 93.9% European/Pākehā, 11.2% Māori, 1.5% Pacific peoples, 1.3% Asian, and 1.7% other ethnicities (totals add to more than 100% since people could identify with multiple ethnicities).

The proportion of people born overseas was 21.1%, compared with 27.1% nationally.

Although some people objected to giving their religion, 54.9% had no religion, 32.5% were Christian, 0.2% were Hindu, 0.8% were Buddhist and 3.4% had other religions.

Of those at least 15 years old, 285 (23.7%) people had a bachelor or higher degree, and 165 (13.7%) people had no formal qualifications. The median income was $37,000, compared with $31,800 nationally. The employment status of those at least 15 was that 612 (50.9%) people were employed full-time, 198 (16.5%) were part-time, and 45 (3.7%) were unemployed.

Economy 

Some farming takes place around Te Horo, as well as small-scale viticulture. Many residents of Te Horo commute to either Wellington or Palmerston North. The beach is popular for swimming and boating and attracts visitors to the town.

Transport 

Te Horo is situated on the North Island's main road and rail routes, State Highway 1 and the North Island Main Trunk railway. The railway was built by the Wellington and Manawatu Railway Company (WMR) as part of its Wellington - Manawatu Line that opened on 1 December 1886 with a station in Te Horo. The WMR was incorporated into the New Zealand Railways Department's national network on 8 December 1908. The railway station, opened on 2 August 1886 was closed to passengers on 27 June 1971 and from 2 November 1987 became a crossing loop only.  A commuter train, the Capital Connection, operates between Palmerston North and Wellington on weekdays but Te Horo passengers must board it in Ōtaki or Waikanae.

Te Horo Beach is situated off major transport routes and is accessible by a local road, Te Horo Beach Road, that leaves State Highway 1 at Te Horo.

Education

References 

Populated places in the Wellington Region
Kapiti Coast District
Beaches of the Wellington Region